Thomas Engel (1922–2015) was a German screenwriter and director of film and television. He was the son of director Erich Engel.

Selected filmography
 Annaluise and Anton (1953) — based on the eponymous novel by Erich Kästner
 Girl with a Future (1954)
 Bon Voyage (1954) — based on Eduard Künneke's operetta 
  (co-director: , 1955)
 Liebe, die den Kopf verliert (1956)
  (1956)
  (1956) — based on the play The Concert by Hermann Bahr
 Wie schön, daß es dich gibt (1957)
  (1957) — based on a novel by Ernst Rudolphi
  (1958) — based on a novel by Maria von Peteani
 Mylord weiß sich zu helfen (1958, TV film) — based on the story Lord Arthur Savile's Crime by Oscar Wilde
  (1958)
  (1959) — based on a novel by 
 The Blue Sea and You (1959)
 I Learned That in Paris (1960)
  (1960)
 Wie einst im Mai (1961, TV film) — based on Walter Kollo's operetta 
  (1961)
 Lauter Lügen (1961, TV film) — Remake of the films All Lies (1938) and Must We Get Divorced? (1953)
  (1961)
 So war Mama (1962, TV film) — based on the play I Remember Mama by John Van Druten and Kathryn Forbes
 Im echten Manne ist ein Kind (1962, TV series)
 Ihr gehorsamer Diener (1962, TV film) — based on the play Your Obedient Servant by Diana Morgan and Dorothea Gotfurt
 Sein Meisterstück (1963, TV film) — based on the play Savez-vous planter les choux by Marcel Achard
 Kater Lampe (1963, TV film) — based on the play  by 
  (1963) — screenplay by Curth Flatow
 Glückliche Reise (1963, TV film) — based on Eduard Künneke's operetta 
 Die Zofen (1964, TV film) — based on the play The Maids by Jean Genet
 Frau Luna (1964) — based on Paul Lincke's operetta 
 Meine Nichte Susanne (1964, TV film) — Remake of the 1950 film My Niece Susanne
 Schicken Sie mir einen Dollar! (1965, TV film) — based on the play The Gimmick by Joseph Julian
 Bei Pfeiffers ist Ball (1966, TV film)
 An einem ganz gewöhnlichen Tag (1966, TV film) — based on the story Salto Mortale by Milo Dor
 Corinne und der Seebär (1966, TV film) — screenplay by 
 Wilhelmina (1966–1968, TV series, 5 episodes) — screenplay by Barbara Noack
 Die Frau des Fotografen (1967, TV film) — based on the play  by Marcel Pagnol
 Heinrich IV (1967, TV film) — based on the play Henry IV by Luigi Pirandello
 Im Ballhaus ist Musike (1967, TV film) — sequel to Bei Pfeiffers ist Ball
 Im Ballhaus wird geschwoft (1968, TV film) — sequel to Im Ballhaus ist Musike
 Gold für Montevasall (1968, TV film)
 Ein Sommer mit Nicole (1969, TV series, 13 episodes)
 Wie ein Wunder kam die Liebe (1969, TV film)
  (1970, TV series, 13 episodes)
 Familie Bergmann (1970–1971, TV series, 2 episodes)
 Die Frau ohne Kuß (1971, TV film) — based on Walter Kollo's operetta
 Ich träume von Millionen (1971, TV film) — sequel to Wie ein Wunder kam die Liebe
 Die keusche Susanne (1972, TV film) — based on Jean Gilbert's operetta Die keusche Susanne
 Hofball bei Zille (1972, TV film)
  (1972–1973, TV series, 13 episodes)
 Alle lieben Célimare (1973, TV film) — based on the play  by Eugène Labiche
  (1973, TV film) — based on the novel  by Claude Tillier
 So'n Theater (1973, TV film)
 Der kleine Doktor (1974, TV series, 7 episodes) — based on stories by Georges Simenon
 Hochzeitsnacht im Paradies (1974, TV film) — based on Friedrich Schröder's operetta Wedding Night in Paradise
 Streng geheim (1975, TV film) — Remake of the 1964 film A Mission for Mr. Dodd
 Beschlossen und verkündet (1975, TV series, 13 episodes)
 Es muss nicht immer Kaviar sein (1977, TV series) — based on a novel by Johannes Mario Simmel
 Drei Damen vom Grill (1977, TV series, the first 6 episodes)
 Grille und Ameise (1979, TV film) — based on a play by Alfonso Paso
 Der Führerschein (1979, TV film) — screenplay by Irina Korschunow
 Ihr 106. Geburtstag (1979, TV film) — based on a play by Jean Sarment
 Der Urlaub (1980, TV film) — screenplay by Irina Korschunow
 Kintopp Kintopp (1981, TV series, 13 episodes)
 Tatort: Im Fadenkreuz (1981, TV series episode)
  (1981, TV film)
 Wie es geschah (1983, TV film) — screenplay by Irina Korschunow
 Plötzlich und unerwartet ... (1985, TV film) — based on a play by Francis Durbridge
 Ein Mann ist soeben erschossen worden (1985, TV film) — based on a play by 
 Der Kandidat (1986, TV film) — based on the play Le Candidat by Gustave Flaubert
 Tatort: Schuldlos schuldig (1988, TV series episode)

References

Bibliography 
 Fritsche, Maria. Homemade Men in Postwar Austrian Cinema: Nationhood, Genre and Masculinity . Berghahn Books, 2013.

External links 
 

1922 births
2015 deaths
Mass media people from Hamburg